The 2014–15 Ligue 1 season was the 77th season since its establishment. Paris Saint-Germain were the two-time defending champions and successfully defended their title.

Teams
There were 20 clubs in the league, with three promoted teams from Ligue 2 replacing the three teams that were relegated from Ligue 1 following the 2013–14 season. All clubs that secured Ligue 1 status for the season were subject to approval by the DNCG before becoming eligible to participate.

Metz was the first team to win promotion from Ligue 2 after a 3–0 victory against Auxerre at the Stade de l'Abbé-Deschamps, ending a six-year span in the lower divisions. Lens returned to the top level after a 2–0 victory against CA Bastia on 16 May 2014 and finished a three-year span in 2nd level. Finally, Caen returned  for the first time in two years following a 2–2 draw with Dijon on 16 May 2014.

 Bastia
 Bordeaux
 Caen
 Evian
 Guingamp
 Lens
 Lille
 Lorient
 Lyon
 Marseille
 Metz
 Monaco
 Montpellier
 Nantes
 Nice
 Paris Saint-Germain
 Reims
 Rennes
 Saint-Étienne
 Toulouse

Stadia and locations

Personnel and kits

Managerial changes

League table

Results

Number of teams by regions

Season statistics

Top goalscorers

Source: Official Goalscorers' Standings

Hat-tricks

5 Player scored five goals

References

External links 

 

Ligue 1 seasons
1
Fra